The Mercedes F1 W05 Hybrid, originally known as the Mercedes F1 W05, was a highly successful Mercedes-Benz Formula One racing car designed and developed under the direction of Bob Bell, Aldo Costa, Geoff Willis, Loïc Serra, Russell Cooley, John Owen, Mike Elliott and Jarrod Murphy to compete in the 2014 FIA Formula One World Championship. The cars were driven by  World Drivers' Champion Lewis Hamilton and Nico Rosberg, both of whom remained with the team for a second and fifth season, respectively. The F1 W05 was designed to use Mercedes's new 1.6-litre V6 turbocharged engine, the PU106A Hybrid.

The chassis was named "F1 W05 Hybrid" to represent the fifth Formula One car that Mercedes had constructed since , while the hybrid was marked to recognize the utilization of fully integrated hybrid power units. The car made its competitive debut at the 2014 Australian Grand Prix, the opening round of the 2014 season. After participating in 18 rounds of Grand Prix racing, the car made its final competition appearance at the season finale race – the 2014 Abu Dhabi Grand Prix, before retirement. As the first Mercedes F1 car of the hybrid era of the sport, this was the car that kick-started an unparalleled period of dominance by Mercedes in the sport that lasted for eight years, delivering 81 Grand Prix wins for Hamilton, 20 for Rosberg (until 2016) and 10 (from 2017) for Valtteri Bottas.

Competitiveness and performance
The car was an instant success, with Nico Rosberg winning the season-opening  by 27 seconds. The car was said to be so dominant because of an innovative design feature on the PU106A, the car's engine. Sky Sports F1 reported that the compressor and turbo were packaged at opposite ends of the internal combustion engine, which gave them the edge in packaging, aerodynamic efficiency, and battery usage. Lewis Hamilton described it as the best car he has ever driven.

At the halfway point of the season, Mercedes had secured all but one win – in Canada, won by Red Bull's Daniel Ricciardo – and one pole, when Williams driver Felipe Massa did so in Austria. In the nineteen races, the F1 W05 Hybrid took sixteen wins (eleven for Hamilton and five for Rosberg), eighteen pole positions (seven for Hamilton and eleven for Rosberg), twelve fastest laps (seven for Hamilton and five for Rosberg), twelve front row lockouts and eleven 1–2 finishes.

Season summary
The car qualified on pole for each race, led every racing lap, won every race, and set every fastest lap. The F1 W05 Hybrid's streak ended at the  where Daniel Ricciardo beat Nico Rosberg to the win, after the car's motor generator unit for kinetic energy (MGU-K) failed.

The next race of the season was the  where the fight between Hamilton and Rosberg got closer. Rosberg's car failed to complete the race and Hamilton won in front of his home fans. The  had two different stories at Mercedes. The one saw Hamilton have a brake disc explode in qualifying and the other saw Rosberg win pole and the race. Hamilton entered the weekend hoping to win his third straight Hungarian Grand Prix. Again like Germany there were two extremely different stories. Hamilton again had an issue in qualifying, with a broken fuel line causing a fire, while Rosberg won pole again. The race was very chaotic, between the rain and safety cars, Hamilton found himself ahead of his teammate to take home third, which extended Mercedes's consecutive podium finishes streak to eleven races. Rosberg recovered to finish second but Hamilton had to retire late in the race.

The two controlled the race and came home first and second for the seventh time in the season. Rosberg's car developed an electrical fault and he therefore had to start from the pit lane. He retired after just 15 laps, when his car would not restart at his first pit stop; it was his second retirement of the season. Hamilton however dominated the race, taking fastest lap and leading all but two laps in the process, and won his seventh race of the season to take the Drivers' Championship lead for the first time since Spain, by a margin of three points heading to Suzuka. Rosberg and Hamilton locked out the front row for the eighth time, with Rosberg taking his eighth pole. The race was wet throughout and Mercedes again dominated but Rosberg could not hold off Hamilton, who took his eighth win of the season, while Rosberg took his eighth second place and Mercedes's eighth 1–2 in the process. The power advantage of the car was shown when they opened up a 17-second lead over third place in just the first three racing laps.

They locked out the front row out for the fifth successive race and Hamilton won comfortably by 13 seconds from Rosberg, who after locking up at turn one on the first lap and pitting recovered and finished second, again proving the true pace of the Mercedes. The two again dominated the race taking the team's tenth 1–2 finish of the season. Hamilton, as had been the case in the previous races, stuck behind in the first half of the race, overtook Rosberg around the halfway point and then controlled the race from there; he won his tenth race of the season, and his fifth in succession. Rosberg and Hamilton finished 1–2 for a record 11th time, beating McLaren's 26-year-old record of 10. Rosberg won the race and cut the gap down to 17 points going into the season finale in Abu Dhabi. Mercedes locked out the front row once again, with Rosberg on pole again. In the race, Hamilton moved ahead of Rosberg at the start and controlled the race throughout, but Rosberg suffered an ERS failure midway through the race. Rosberg carried on but could only manage 14th position (the only time the team finished a race outside the points in the entire season), while Hamilton won his 11th race of the season and with it the World Championship.

Complete Formula One results
(key) (results in bold indicate pole position; results in italics indicate fastest lap)

‡ — Teams and drivers scored double points at the Abu Dhabi Grand Prix.

References

F1 W05
2014 Formula One season cars
Formula One championship-winning cars